Rasu Kami is a small Tripuri village situated on the foot-hills of Boromura hill range in Sadar sub-division of West Tripura, India. It lies 3 km west of Champaknagar from the Assam-Agartala highway and 4 km north of Jirania. The people speak a local language of Kokborok. The population of the village is 60 persons.

Origin of the name
The name Rasu Kami or Rasu Para as it is known, has a history from before the independence of India. The villages of Tripura had a tradition of naming their villages after the village head or the most powerful and influential person of the village.

A tribal person from the Tripuri community, Horijoy Debbarma had three sons and a daughter. Amongst them, the second son, Samprai Debbarma with his wife Sandhya Mali Debbarma, settled on the present day Rasu Kami. They had four sons: Rajkumar Debbarma,  Sikirai Debbarma, Khilingrai Debbarma, and Sukuram Debbarma. The village where Samprai Debbarma settled was previously known as Horijoy Kami named after his father Horijoy Debbarma. It was here in this village where Rajkumar was born. Later on when Rajkumar grew up and became a very well known and influential person, the village name was changed to Rasu Kami following the tradition.

The economy
The people here are involved mainly in farming, driving, business and education. Farming is mainly of paddy. But plantations of bamboo, pineapple, banana, and mango is also done. Fish rearing is also done by few families in their ponds. There is a state-owned sericulture farm nearby. Many brick industries surrounds this village which are the main source of the pollution in this village. Of course they can be termed as one of the source of income too.

The Ring Kua
There is a ring-well in the heart of the village which has never dried since it was dug and prepared. Even if wells and ponds of nearby villages dry up still it doesn't dry. It has been the source of water for this village as well as the nearby surrounding villages. It has been quenching the thirst of all people and animals dwelling in and around Rasu Kami.

Neighbouring villages
Nearby villages are Basiram Kwpra, Mangal Sardar, Purna Thakur, Kumar Sadhu, Sarath Chowdhury, Khamarbari, Kolabagan, Kulang Thakur and Joynagar.

See also
Tripura Baptist Christian Union
Sadar North Baptist Association
Kokborok
Tripuri people

West Tripura district
Villages in West Tripura district